Mya-Rose Craig (born 2002), also known as Birdgirl, is a British-Bangladeshi ornithologist, author, and campaigner for equal rights. In February 2020, she received an honorary  doctorate in science (DSc hc) from the University of Bristol, and is said to be the youngest British person to receive such an award. In June 2022, she published the U.K. edition of her autobiography, Birdgirl, which will be publishing in the U.S. in March 2023. 

Craig went to Chew Valley School and is now studying Human, Social and Political Sciences at St John's College, Cambridge University. She created the non-profit organisation Black2Nature to run nature camps for black and minority ethnic children. Her honorary degree was awarded for that initiative, and in recognition of her advocacy for visible minority ethnic (VME) children and teenagers. She was nominated by Richard Pancost from University of Bristol.

She defines "VME" as distinct from Black, Asian and minority ethnic (BAME), as the latter includes white minority ethnic groups. She calls on white-led organisations in the nature conservation and media and environmental sectors to do more to engage with young VME people, and speaks of the racism inherent in nature conservation, though other than unconnected anecdotes, is unable to actually evidence these divisive, although profitable, claims.

Craig was a "Bristol 2015 Ambassador" during the city's year as European Green Capital.

She is a bird ringer and won the National Biodiversity Network's 2018 Gilbert White Youth Award for recording terrestrial and freshwater wildlife. She contributed to Chris Packham's A People’s Manifesto for Wildlife, at Packham's invitation. She spoke to a crowd of 10,000 at the Packham-organised People's Walk for Wildlife.

At the age of twelve, she had a column, "Birding Tales", in the Chew Valley Gazette. Her writing was also published in New Internationalist when she was thirteen.

She has made a number of national television appearances and interviews, including the BBC's The One Show and ITV's News at Ten. In 2010, she was featured in a BBC Four documentary (filmed in 2009, when she was seven years old), Twitchers: A Very British Obsession, alongside Lee Evans.

In 2020, she and her mother Helena were first-round judges for Countryfile's annual photographic competition. She featured in a pre-recorded segment for Winterwatch 2020, viewing Eurasian penduline tits at Steart Marshes.

She lives in Compton Martin. Her mother is a Bengali Muslim with family from the Sylhet Division of Bangladesh. Her father is British and from Liverpool.

References

External links 

 
 
 Audio interview, April 2019
 2019 interview from Bird Watching magazine

Living people
Place of birth missing (living people)
British ornithologists
British people of Bangladeshi descent
Women ornithologists
2002 births
People educated at Chew Valley School
Race relations in the United Kingdom
Birdwatchers